Graveley is a village and civil parish about four miles east of Hitchin and two miles north of Stevenage in Hertfordshire, England. The population of the parish in the 2011 census was 487. A milestone in the village states that it is 33 miles from London.

History
Graveley is mentioned in the Domesday Book. It was granted by William the Conqueror to Goisbert of Beauvais. 
The village is built on a Roman road, which developed into a section of the Great North Road. The village was by-passed by the A1 (M) motorway in the 1960s.

Parish boundaries

The parish absorbed the site of a lost settlement, Chesfield (or Chivesfield), about a mile to the east of Graveley; little remains there apart from the ruined walls of its 14th-century church, a farm and a couple of cottages. Graveley and Chesfield had been separate parishes, but were united in 1445.

In 1953, the southern part of Graveley parish, including Corey's Mill and the future site of the Lister Hospital was transferred to become part of Stevenage Urban District.

In 2011, Graveley parish ceded some of its territory to become the new civil parish of Great Ashby.

Architecture
The medieval church is of flint construction.

There are a number of attractive cottages and houses, including The George and Dragon pub, which has an 18th-century facade, and The Wagon & Horses. At one time there were four pubs, but two have now closed down.

External links

 Graveley Village website

References

Villages in Hertfordshire
Civil parishes in Hertfordshire